20,000 Eyes is a 1961 American drama film directed by Jack Leewood, written by Jack W. Thomas, and starring Gene Nelson, Merry Anders, James Brown, John Banner, Judith Rawlins and Robert Shayne.

The film was released on June 14, 1961, by 20th Century Fox.

Plot

Needing money in a hurry for a diamond-mine interest, investment broker, Dan Warren, embezzles $100,000 from client, Kurt Novak, a criminal himself ($ in  dollars ). Novak discovers the theft and gives Warren five days to pay him back or else meet with an "accident." But Warren has another scheme in mind.

Cast
Gene Nelson as Dan Warren
Merry Anders as Karen Walker
James Brown as Jerry Manning
John Banner as Kurt Novak
Judith Rawlins as Girl
Robert Shayne as Police Lieutenant
Paul Maxey as Ryan
Rex Holman as High School Boy
Ollie O'Toole as Moore
Barbara Parkins as High School Girl
Bruno VeSota as Museum Watchman
Rusty Wescoatt as Policeman

Production
The film was announced in January, 1961, and Daniel Ceccaldi was originally sought for the lead role. Filming began in March, 1961 with Gene Nelson instead.

References

External links
 

1961 films
1960s English-language films
20th Century Fox films
CinemaScope films
American drama films
1961 drama films
Films scored by Albert Glasser
1960s American films